Hormosphaeria is a genus of fungi within the Arthoniales order. The genus has not been placed into a family.

References

Arthoniomycetes
Lichen genera